Carnalbanagh is a small village and townland (of 1,628 acres) in County Antrim, Northern Ireland, 13 km east-north-east of Ballymena. It is situated in the civil parish of Tickmacrevan and the historic barony of Glenarm Lower, and is part of Mid and East Antrim district. It lies above Glenarm and is close to Mount Slemish.

Local services include Carnalbanagh Primary School, Orange Hall and Presbyterian church. The local flute band is known as Carnalbanagh Flute Band.

The name 'Carnalbanagh' can also be spelt 'Cairnalbana' or 'Carnalbana.'

Presbyterian Church 
The congregation saw their new minister John Brogan installed on 10 January 2020 and he commenced his ministry on 12 January 2020.

See also
List of towns and villages in Northern Ireland
List of townlands in County Antrim

References

External links
Carnalbanagh Primary School
Cairnalbana Presbyterian Church

Villages in County Antrim
Civil parish of Tickmacrevan
Townlands of County Antrim